Tvoje lice zvuči poznato is the Croatian version of Your Face Sounds Familiar. It started on 5 October 2014. There are four judges, Nives Celzijus (actress and singer), Indira Levak (singer), Igor Mešin (actor and TV presenter) and Goran Navojec (actor).

Format
The show challenges celebrities (singers and actors) to perform as different iconic music artists every week, which are chosen by the show's "Randomiser". They are then judged by the panel of celebrity judges. Each celebrity gets transformed into a different singer each week, and performs an iconic song and dance routine well known by that particular singer. The 'randomiser' can choose any older or younger artist available in the machine, or even a singer of the opposite sex, or a deceased singer. Winner of each episode wins 10 000 HRK, and winner of whole show wins 40 000 HRK. All money goes to charity of winner's own choice. The show lasts 13 weeks (12 in the first season and the second season).
In the third episode of the third season, jokers were introduced. The celebrities had ability to use their joker once per season when they didn't like what the randomiser has chosen for them to perform, or if they thought the task is too hard. They could choose another celebrity to perform instead of them. 
It was announced that the show will get even more new content in the fourth season, but the 'Joker' ability was removed. The new content in the fourth season was the introduction of holographic performances. If the "Randomiser" chooses a celebrity should perform a duet, they can do it using the pre-recorded hologram for one of the given singers. In the fifth season, celebrity contestant can perform as another celebrity with a child transformed in the same celebrity. The winner of every episode gets to donate 10 000 HRK, while the overall leader gets to donate 40 000 HRK at the end of the season.

Voting
The contestants are awarded points from the judges (and each other) based on their singing and dance routines. Judges give points from 4 to 12, with the exception of 11. After that, each contestant gives 5 points to a fellow contestant of their choice (known as "Bonus" points). In week 12 (semi-final week), four contestants with the highest number of votes will qualify to the final. In week 13 (grand final), previous points will be transformed into 4-7 system, jury will give the points from 8 to 12, and contestants will give 5 points to a fellow contestant of their choice.

Judges

 Nives Celzijus - Croatian actress and singer, winner of the fourth season of this show. (didn't judge in the week 12 of the season 5)
 Goran Navojec - Croatian actor, known for many roles on television series and in feature films.
 Indira Levak - Croatian singer, ex lead vocalist of the group Colonia
 Igor Mešin - actor and host of this show in first five seasons.

Past members
Sandra Bagarić - Bosnian opera singer, also active in Croatia (didn't judge in the Final of the Season 4)
Branko Đurić - Bosnian actor, comedian, director and musician
Tomo in der Mühlen - German-born music producer and DJ based in New York City and Zagreb.
 Mario Petreković - Croatian actor, winner of the first season of this show.
 Damir Kedžo - Croatian singer, winner of the third season of this show
 Saša Lozar - Croatian singer, winner of the second season of this show.

Guest judges

Series

See also
Tvoje lice zvuči poznato (Croatian season 1)
Tvoje lice zvuči poznato (Croatian season 2)
Tvoje lice zvuči poznato (Croatian season 3)
Tvoje lice zvuči poznato (Croatian season 4)
Tvoje lice zvuči poznato (Croatian season 5)

References

Croatian reality television series
Croatia
2014 Croatian television series debuts
2010s Croatian television series
Nova TV (Croatia) original programming